Scandinavism, also called Scandinavianism or pan-Scandinavianism, is an ideology that supports various degrees of cooperation among the Scandinavian countries. Scandinavism comprises the literary, linguistic and cultural movement that focuses on promoting a shared Scandinavian past, a shared cultural heritage, a common Scandinavian mythology and a common language or dialect continuum (from the common ancestor language of Old Norse), and which led to the formation of joint periodicals and societies in support of Scandinavian literature and languages. Nordism expands the scope to include Iceland and Finland.

The movement was most popular among Danes and Swedes.

History 
According to historian Sverre Bagge, prior to the formation of state-like kingdoms in Scandinavia, Scandinavia was culturally and linguistically homogeneous. Even in the thirteenth century the term ‘Danish tongue’ was used for the language throughout the area. There were different dialects, but the lines of division between them did not correspond to the later national borders. Religion and customs were also similar, during the pagan as well as the Christian periods. Thus, no cultural or linguistic distinctions prevented unification of each country. Nor, on the other hand, did such distinctions give rise to natural borders between the kingdoms that eventually emerged.Pan-Scandinavianism as a modern movement originated in the 19th century, but the movement had already begun spreading a century earlier in circles of literature and science. The Pan-Scandinavian movement paralleled the unification movements of Germany and  Italy. As opposed to the German and Italian counterparts, the Scandinavian state-building project was not successful and is no longer pursued. It was at its height in the mid-19th century and supported the idea of Scandinavian unity.

The movement was initiated by Danish and Swedish university students in the 1840s, with a base in Scania. In the beginning, the political establishments in the two countries, including the absolute monarch Christian VIII and Charles XIV with his "one man government", were suspicious of the movement. The movement was a significant force from 1846 to 1864, however the movement eventually dwindled and only had strong support among the Swedish-speaking population of Finland.

The collapse of Pan-Scandinavianism came in 1864 when the Second Schleswig-Holstein War broke out. King Karl XV of Sweden (who was also King Karl IV of Norway), who reigned from 1859 until his death in 1872, in spite of championing Pan-Scandinivianism, failed to help Denmark in the war.

Author Hans Christian Andersen became an adherent of Scandinavism after a visit to Sweden in 1837, and committed himself to writing a poem that would convey the relatedness of Swedes, Danes and Norwegians. It was in July 1839, during a visit to the island of Funen in Denmark, that Andersen first wrote the text of his poem, Jeg er en Skandinav ("I am a Scandinavian"). Andersen composed the poem to capture "the beauty of the Nordic spirit, the way the three sister nations have gradually grown together", as part of a Scandinavian national anthem. Composer Otto Lindblad set the poem to music, and the composition was published in January 1840. Its popularity peaked in 1845, after which it was seldom sung.

In literature 
The Sherlock Holmes story "A Scandal in Bohemia" mentions a fictional King of Scandinavia whose daughter is about to marry the (also fictional) King of Bohemia, a major protagonist in the story.

See also 

 Nordic Council
 Nordic Language Convention
 Nordic Passport Union
 Nordic student meeting
 Pan-nationalism
 Scandinavian defence union
 Viking revival
 Kalmar Union

References

Further reading 
 
 'Pan-Scandinavianism. Reference Points in the 19th Century (1815-1864)' by Mircea-Cristian Ghenghea

External links 
 The Helsinki Treaty of 1962  Nicknamed as constitution of the Nordic Countries.
 Jeg er en Skandinav. A rendition of H. C. Andersen's poem, set to Otto Lindblad's music.

Scandinavia
Pan-nationalism
Political theories
Nordic politics